Graham Harry Booth (29 March 1940 – 14 December 2011) was a British UK Independence Party (UKIP) politician who served as a Member of the European Parliament (MEP) for South West England from 2002 to 2008.

Booth was born in Paignton, Devon and educated at Torquay Boys' Grammar School. Before he entered politics, he was a businessman in the building and tourism trades. In the 1999 European Parliament elections, Booth was the number two candidate on the UKIP list for South West England.  Consequently, he became an MEP in 2002 as the replacement for Michael Holmes, former party leader, when Holmes resigned from the European Parliament. Booth was re-elected in 2004 with a greatly increased vote. In the 2005 General Election he contested the Torbay constituency in Devon, and gained 7.9% of the vote.

UKIP MEPs frequently claim that the European Parliament is a powerless talking shop, with real lawmaking power resting with the European Commission. However, Graham Booth is credited with having helped save the Isles of Scilly helicopter shuttle service in his constituency by means of an astute parliamentary speech in 2003. The service, which is crucial to life on the islands, had been threatened with closure by a heavy-handed interpretation of a new EU directive aimed at larger airlines. Following Booth's speech, an alliance between UKIP and the UK Labour Party MEPs persuaded the EU Transport Commissioner to amend the directive, allowing the service (and similar 'social carriers' across Europe) to continue in business.

Booth retired from his role as a UKIP MEP on 1 October 2008 and was replaced by the next candidate on the list, Trevor Colman. He continued to be a keen activist in and around the bay until his death in December 2011.

References

External links
Profile on the European Parliament website

1940 births
2011 deaths
People from Paignton
People educated at Torquay Boys' Grammar School
UK Independence Party MEPs
MEPs for England 1999–2004
MEPs for England 2004–2009